The Building at High and Cannon Streets was a historic commercial building located at Seaford, Sussex County, Delaware. It was built about 1885, and was a two-story, ten-bay, flat-roofed frame structure sheathed in pressed tin and asphalt brick-like siding.  The original showcase windows and recessed doorways revealed that the building was originally divided into several stores.

It was added to the National Register of Historic Places in 1987.

References

Commercial buildings on the National Register of Historic Places in Delaware
Commercial buildings completed in 1885
Buildings and structures in Sussex County, Delaware
Seaford, Delaware
National Register of Historic Places in Sussex County, Delaware
1885 establishments in Delaware